Womack is an unincorporated community in Bosque County in Central Texas. According to the Handbook of Texas, it had a population of 25 as of 2000.

History
In 1852, James Pinckney Henderson came to own the land after he bought it from James Smith. Most of the area's residents were German immigrants in its early years. Womack was granted a post office in 1880 inside Hugh S. Anderson's general store, only to close 26 years later. Church services were held in German. The population before World War II was estimated to be around 40 residents and lost half of it in 1949. By 2000, Womack only had 25 people.

Geography

Education
In the 1920s, classes were conducted in German, with children also learning English. Today, Womack is served by the Clifton Independent School District.

References

Unincorporated communities in Bosque County, Texas
Unincorporated communities in Texas